Kohan may refer to:

People 
 Kohan (surname)
 Kōhan Kawauchi (1920–2008)

Places
 Kohan, Kerman, a village in Kerman Province, Iran
 Kohan, Semnan, a village in Semnan Province, Iran
 Gaz Kohan
 Kohan Chenar
 Pir Kohan
 Rob-e Kohan

Companies 
 Kohan Retail Investment Group, a shopping mall investment company in the United States

Other uses
 Kohan: Immortal Sovereigns, a 2001 video game

See also 
 Cohan
 Kohen (disambiguation)